Funny Girl is a musical with score by Jule Styne, lyrics by Bob Merrill, and book by Isobel Lennart, that first opened on Broadway in 1964. The semi-biographical plot is based on the life and career of comedian and Broadway star Fanny Brice, featuring her stormy relationship with entrepreneur and gambler Nicky Arnstein.

Barbra Streisand starred in the original Broadway musical, produced by Brice's son-in-law Ray Stark. The production received eight nominations at the 18th Tony Awards. The original cast recording of Funny Girl was inducted into the Grammy Hall of Fame in 2004.
	
A Broadway revival, with a revised book by Harvey Fierstein, opened April 24, 2022, starring Beanie Feldstein. Lea Michele was subsequently cast in September 2022, releasing a new Broadway cast recording two months later.

Synopsis
The musical is set in and around New York City just prior to and following World War I. Ziegfeld Follies star Fanny Brice, awaiting the return of her husband Nicky Arnstein from prison, reflects on their life together, and their story is told as a flashback.

Act I
Fanny is a stage-struck teen who gets her first job in vaudeville. Her mother and her mother’s friend Mrs. Strakosh try to dissuade her from show business because Fanny is not the typical beauty ("If a Girl Isn't Pretty"). But Fanny perseveres ("I'm the Greatest Star") and is helped and encouraged by Eddie Ryan, a dancer she meets in the vaudeville shows. Once Fanny's career takes off, Eddie and Mrs. Brice lament that once she's on Broadway she'll forget about them ("Who Taught Her Everything?"). Fanny performs a supposedly romantic number in the Follies, but she turns it into a classic comic routine, ending the number as a pregnant bride ("His Love Makes Me Beautiful"), causing an uproar.

She meets the sophisticated and handsome Nicky Arnstein, who accompanies Fanny to her mother's opening night party on "Henry Street". Fanny is clearly falling in love with Nick, while acknowledging their complex vulnerabilities ("People"). Later they meet in Baltimore and have a private dinner at a swanky restaurant and declare their feelings ("You Are Woman, I Am Man"). Fanny is determined to marry Nick, regardless of his gambling past ("Don't Rain on My Parade").

Act II
The two marry and move to a mansion on Long Island ("Sadie, Sadie"). In the meantime, Mrs. Strakosh and Eddie suggest to Mrs. Brice that she should find a man to marry, now that her daughter is supporting her ("Find Yourself a Man"). Fanny has become a major star with the Ziegfeld Follies ("Rat-Tat-Tat-Tat"). Nick asks Ziegfeld to invest in a gambling casino, but although Ziegfeld passes, Fanny insists on investing. When the venture fails and they lose their money, Fanny tries to make light of it, which propels Nick to get involved in a shady bond deal, resulting in his arrest for embezzlement. Fanny feels helpless but stronger than ever in her love for him ("The Music That Makes Me Dance").

In the present, Fanny is waiting for Nick to arrive and has time to reflect on her situation. Nick arrives, newly released from prison, and he and Fanny decide to separate. She is heartbroken, but resolves to pick up her life again ("Don't Rain on My Parade (Reprise)").

Background
Stark married Fanny Brice's and Nicky Arnstein's daughter Frances Brice in 1940.  In telling Fanny's story, Stark would produce the Broadway musical, film version and film sequel Funny Lady.

Ray Stark commissioned an authorized biography of Brice, based on taped recollections she had dictated but was unhappy with the result. It eventually cost him $50,000 to stop the publication of The Fabulous Fanny, as it had been titled by the author. Stark then turned to Ben Hecht to write the screenplay for a biopic, but neither Hecht nor the ten writers who succeeded him were able to produce a version that satisfied Stark. Finally, Isobel Lennart submitted My Man, which pleased both Stark and Columbia Pictures executives, who offered Stark $400,000 plus a percentage of the gross for the property.

After reading the screenplay, Mary Martin contacted Stark and proposed it be adapted for a stage musical. Stark discussed the possibility with producer David Merrick, who suggested Jule Styne and Stephen Sondheim compose the score. Sondheim told Styne, "I don't want to do the life of Fanny Brice with Mary Martin. She's not Jewish. You need someone ethnic for the part." Shortly after, Martin lost interest in the project and backed out.

Merrick discussed the project with Jerome Robbins, who gave the screenplay to Anne Bancroft. She agreed to play Brice if she could handle the score. Merrick suggested Styne collaborate with Dorothy Fields, but the composer was not interested. He went to Palm Beach, Florida, for a month and composed music he thought Bancroft would be able to sing. While he was there, he met Bob Merrill, and he played the five melodies he already had written for him. Merrill agreed to write lyrics for them; these included "Who Are You Now?" and "The Music That Makes Me Dance". Styne was happy with the results and the two men completed the rest of the score, then flew to Los Angeles to play it for Stark, Robbins, and Bancroft, who was at odds with Merrill because of an earlier personal conflict. She listened to the score, then stated, "I want no part of this. It's not for me".

With Bancroft out of the picture, Eydie Gormé was considered, but she agreed to play Brice only if her husband Steve Lawrence was cast as Nick Arnstein. Since they thought he was wrong for the role, Stark and Robbins approached Carol Burnett, who said, "I'd love to do it but what you need is a Jewish girl." With options running out, Styne thought Barbra Streisand, whom he remembered from I Can Get It for You Wholesale, would be perfect. She was performing at the Bon Soir in Greenwich Village and Styne urged Robbins to see her. He was impressed and asked her to audition. Styne later recalled, "She looked awful ... All her clothes were out of thrift shops. I saw Fran Stark staring at her, obvious distaste on her face." Despite his wife's objections, Stark hired Streisand on the spot.

Robbins had an argument with Lennart and told Stark he wanted her replaced because he thought she was not capable of adapting her screenplay into a viable book for a stage musical. Stark refused and Robbins quit the project.

Funny Girl temporarily was shelved, and Styne moved on to other projects, including Fade Out – Fade In for Carol Burnett. Then Merrick signed Bob Fosse to direct Funny Girl, and work began on it again, until Fosse quit and the show went into limbo for several months. Then Merrick suggested Stark hire Garson Kanin. It was Merrick's last contribution to the production; shortly afterward he bowed out, and Stark became sole producer.

Streisand was not enthusiastic about Kanin as a director and insisted she wanted Robbins back, especially after Kanin suggested "People" be cut from the score because it didn't fit the character. Streisand already had recorded the song for a single release, and Merrill insisted, "It has to be in the show because it's the greatest thing she's ever done." Kanin agreed to let it remain based on audience reaction to it. By the time the show opened in Boston, people were so familiar with "People" they applauded it during the overture.

There were problems with the script and score throughout rehearsals, and when Funny Girl opened at the Shubert Theatre in Boston it was too long, even though thirty minutes already had been cut. The critics praised Streisand but disliked the show. Lennart continued to edit her book and deleted another thirty minutes before the show moved to Philadelphia, where critics thought the show could be a hit if the libretto problems were rectified.

The New York opening was postponed five times while extra weeks were played out of town. Funny Girl ended up playing two tryout periods in Philadelphia, at the Forrest and Erlanger theaters. Five songs were cut, and "You Are Woman", a solo for Sydney Chaplin, was rewritten as a counterpoint duet. Streisand was still unhappy with Kanin and was pleased when Robbins returned to oversee the choreography by Carol Haney.

Kanin's novel Smash is based loosely on his experience directing Funny Girl.

Cast

Notable replacements 
Broadway (1964-67)
Fanny Brice: Mimi Hines
Nick Arnstein: Johnny Desmond

Broadway revival (2022– )
Fanny Brice: Julie Benko, Lea Michele
Mrs. Brice: Tovah Feldshuh

Additional performers 
Fanny Brice: Stephanie J. Block, Debbie Gibson, Leslie Kritzer
Nick Arnstein: Robert Cuccioli, Robert Westenberg

Productions

Broadway 
After seventeen previews, the Broadway production opened March 26, 1964, at the Winter Garden Theatre, subsequently transferring to the Majestic Theatre and The Broadway Theatre, where it closed on July 1, 1967, to complete its total run of 1,348 performances. The musical was directed by Garson Kanin and choreographed by Carol Haney under the supervision of Jerome Robbins. In addition to Streisand and Chaplin, the original cast included Kay Medford, Danny Meehan, Jean Stapleton, and Lainie Kazan, who also served as Streisand's understudy. Later in the run, Streisand and Chaplin were replaced by Mimi Hines and Johnny Desmond, and Hines' husband and comedy partner Phil Ford also joined the cast.

West End 
Streisand reprised her role in the West End production at the Prince of Wales Theatre directed by Lawrence Kasha, which opened April 13, 1966. When Streisand became pregnant and had to drop out of the show, her understudy, Lisa Shane, wife of The Italian Job director Peter Collinson, took over, and continued to perform until the show closed.

Australia 
The Australasian premiere season commenced March 4, 1966, at the Her Majesty's Theatre, Sydney. The production starred Jill Perryman as Fanny Brice,  Bruce Barry as Nick Arnstein, Evie Hayes as Mrs. Brice, and Bill Yule as Eddie Ryan.

In 1999, The Production Company produced Funny Girl at the Arts Centre Melbourne, starring Caroline O'Connor and Nancye Hayes. The production was revived in 2016, with O'Connor and Hayes reprising their roles.

A concert version was staged at the Sydney Opera House from July 12–14, 2018. The role of Fanny Brice on stage was shared by: Michala Banas, Natalie Bassingthwaighte, Casey Donovan, Virginia Gay, Verity Hunt-Ballard, Dami Im, Maggie McKenna, Zahra Newman, Caroline O’Connor, Queenie van de Zandt and Megan Washington. The show also starred Trevor Ashley, Nancye Hayes and Don Hany as Nick Arnstein.

North American tours 
The First National Tour gave top billing to Lillian Roth as Mrs. Brice, Anthony George as Nick, with Marilyn Michaels as Fanny billed third.

A 1996 United States National tour starred Debbie Gibson as Fanny Brice and Robert Westenberg as Nick Arnstein. The planned 30-city tour started in Pittsburgh, Pennsylvania in October 1996, but ended prematurely in November 1996 in Green Bay, Wisconsin.

A 2023 United States national tour of the 2022 Broadway revival is scheduled to launch in Providence, Rhode Island on September 9, 2023.

West End revival 
The show's first ever full-scale revival began previews at the Menier Chocolate Factory on November 20, 2015, officially opening December 2 for a limited run to March 5, 2016. The production starred Sheridan Smith, with Darius Campbell as Nick, directed by Michael Mayer, with a revised book by Harvey Fierstein. The entire run sold out within a day, making it the Menier's fastest selling show on record. Following this, the show transferred to London's Savoy Theatre on April 9, 2016, for a run through to September 10, 2016. The show subsequently extended until October 8 due to phenomenal public demand. However, Smith became indisposed on April 28, 2016, and the show was halted 15 minutes in. She was replaced by her understudy, Natasha J Barnes, who continued to play the role until Smith's eventual return on July 8.

A UK tour of the Menier production began in February 2017, at the Palace Theatre, Manchester. After very favourable reviews, both Smith and Barnes returned to the role of Fanny Brice and alternative venues throughout the UK tour.

Paris 
A Paris production opened in November 2019 at Théâtre Marigny, directed and choreographed by Stephen Mear and featuring Christina Bianco as Fanny. The show received unanimous rave reviews, with significant praise for Bianco. The production was extended, doubling its initial run dates.

Broadway revival 
A revival production began Broadway previews on March 26, 2022, at the August Wilson Theatre with an official opening on April 24, 2022, starring Beanie Feldstein as Fanny Brice, directed by Michael Mayer, music directed by Michael Rafter, with a revised book by Harvey Fierstein. The production also starred Ramin Karimloo as Nick Arnstein, Jared Grimes as Eddie Ryan, and Jane Lynch as Mrs. Brice. The production received mostly negative reviews from critics but Grimes received a Tony Award nomination for Best Featured Actor in a Musical. On July 10, 2022, Feldstein announced that she would depart the production at the end of the month, instead of September as previously planned; the following day, the production confirmed that Lea Michele and Tovah Feldshuh would replace Feldstein and Lynch respectively from September 6, with Julie Benko as Fanny in the interim. On August 9, 2022, Lynch announced that she would depart the production on August 14, instead of the previously planned date in September, and that standby Liz McCartney would play the role of Mrs. Brice until Feldshuh began her run. On March 2, 2023, it was announced that the production would close on September 3, 2023 after 599 performances. 

Lea Michele taking on the role of Fanny Brice parallels her Glee character storyline, where Rachel Berry lands her dream role in Broadway's (fictional) first revival of Funny Girl. Michele received critical acclaim in the role with universal positive reviews, including many citing superior vocals compared to her predecessor.

Other productions 
On September 23, 2002, a concert version for the benefit of the Actors' Fund was staged in New York City at the New Amsterdam Theatre. Performers included Carolee Carmello, Kristin Chenoweth, Sutton Foster, Ana Gasteyer, Whoopi Goldberg, Jane Krakowski, Judy Kuhn, Julia Murney, LaChanze, Ricki Lake, Andrea Martin, Idina Menzel, Bebe Neuwirth, Kaye Ballard, Alice Playten, Lillias White, Len Cariou, Jason Danieley, Peter Gallagher, Gary Beach, and The Rockettes.

In regional theatre the Paper Mill Playhouse, Millburn, New Jersey, production ran in April to May 2001 with Leslie Kritzer and Robert Cuccioli. The New York Times reviewer noted: "What makes it all the more impressive is that few actors, or theater companies outside of summer stock, dare to attempt Jule Styne's and Bob Merrill's grand spectacle that propelled Barbra Streisand's career nearly 40 years ago." The Westchester Broadway Theatre production ran from March to June 2009, with Jill Abramovitz as Fanny. The Drury Lane Oakbrook, Oakbrook Terrace, Illinois, production ran from December 2009 to March 7, 2010. Gary Griffin was the co-director with Drury Lane artistic director William Osetek, with the cast that featured Sara Sheperd.

A revival directed by Bartlett Sher had been announced to premiere at the Ahmanson Theatre in Los Angeles in January 2012 with Lauren Ambrose starring as Fanny Brice and Bobby Cannavale as Nick Arnstein, and then open on Broadway in April 2012. However, on November 3, 2011, producer Bob Boyett announced that this production has been postponed. He said "We have made the extremely difficult decision today to postpone our production of Funny Girl. Given the current economic climate, many Broadway producing investors have found it impossible to maintain their standard level of financial commitment."

The first lavish Israeli production of the musical premiered in 2016, 52 years after the original Broadway premiere. There was a controversy about the casting for the role of Fanny Brice. The role was promised for actress Tali Oren, who was a freelanced actress, but then the role was offered to Mia Dagan who was signed with Beit Lessin Theatre. Dagan, who jumped on the opportunity in the first minute, took the role and signed off the contract with Beit Lessin. The production also included Amos Tamam as Nick Arnstein.

Cast album

The cast album was released on Capitol Records when Streisand's label Columbia Records declined to produce the recording. It peaked at No. 2 on the Billboard 200 and achieved gold record status. The recording was issued on CD in 1987 on Capitol and then in 1992 on EMI's Broadway Angel label. The album received a commemorative 50th anniversary box set edition, released April 29, 2014, with an LP, remastered CD, and 48-page book of photographs from the original Broadway production.

A new Broadway cast recording with Lea Michele was digitally released November 18, 2022. Michele and the cast received praise for their vocals, and the album topped the Billboard Cast Albums Chart.

Musical numbers
Numerous songs were tried and cut during the show's initial development.

Original production

Act I
 "Overture" – Orchestra
 "If a Girl Isn't Pretty" – Mrs. Strakosh, Mrs. Brice, Eddie Ryan and People
 "I'm the Greatest Star" – Fanny Brice
 "Cornet Man" – Fanny Brice, Snub Taylor and Keeney Chorus
 "Who Taught Her Everything?" – Mrs. Brice and Eddie Ryan
 "His Love Makes Me Beautiful" – Ziegfeld Tenor, Ziegfeld Girls and Fanny Brice
 "I Want to Be Seen with You Tonight" – Nick Arnstein and Fanny Brice
 "Henry Street" – Henry Street Neighbors
 "People" – Fanny Brice
 "You Are Woman" – Nick Arnstein and Fanny Brice
 "Don't Rain on My Parade" – Fanny Brice

Act II
 "Sadie, Sadie" – Fanny Brice and Friends
 "Find Yourself a Man" – Mrs. Strakosh, Mrs. Brice and Eddie Ryan
 "Rat-Tat-Tat-Tat" – Ziegfeld Company and Fanny Brice
 "Who Are You Now?" – Fanny Brice
 "The Music That Makes Me Dance" – Fanny Brice
 "Don't Rain on My Parade" (Reprise) – Fanny Brice

West End revival (2016)

Act I
 "Overture" – Orchestra
 "If a Girl Isn't Pretty" – Mrs. Brice, Mrs. Meeker, Mrs. Strakosh, Mr. Keeney, Eddie Ryan and Keeney Company
 "I'm the Greatest Star" – Fanny Brice
 "I'm the Greatest Star (Reprise)" – Mrs. Brice and Fanny Brice
 "Cornet Man" – Fanny Brice and Keeney Company
 "His Love Makes Me Beautiful" – Ziegfeld Tenor, Fanny Brice and Ziegfeld Company
 "I Want to Be Seen with You Tonight" – Nick Arnstein and Fanny Brice
 "Henry Street" – Mrs. Meeker, Mrs. Brice, Mrs Strakosh and Henry Street Neighbors
 "People" – Fanny Brice
 "You Are Woman" – Nick Arnstein and Fanny Brice
 "Don't Rain on My Parade" – Fanny Brice

Act II
 "Entr'acte" – Orchestra
 "Don't Rain on My Parade (Reprise I)" – Fanny Brice
 "Sadie, Sadie" – Fanny Brice and Friends
 "Who Taught Her Everything?" – Eddie Ryan and Mrs. Brice 
 "Temporary Arrangement" – Nick Arnstein and Businessmen
 "Rat-Tat-Tat-Tat" – Fanny Brice and Ziegfeld Company
 "Who Are You Now? / People (Reprise)" – Fanny Brice and Nick Arnstein
 "The Music That Makes Me Dance / Dream Ballet" – Fanny Brice
 "Funny Girl / Don't Rain On My Parade (Reprise II)" – Fanny Brice
 "Bows / People (Reprise II)" – Full Company

Broadway revival (2022) 

Act I
"Overture" – Orchestra
"Who Are You Now?" – Fanny Brice
"If a Girl Isn't Pretty" – Mrs. Brice, Mrs. Meeker, Mrs. Strakosh, Mr. Keeney, Eddie Ryan and Keeney Company
"I'm the Greatest Star" – Fanny Brice
"I'm the Greatest Star (Reprise)" – Mrs. Brice and Fanny Brice
"Cornet Man" – Fanny Brice and Cornet Men
"His Love Makes Me Beautiful" – Ziegfeld Tenor, Fanny Brice, and Ensemble
"I Want to Be Seen with You Tonight" – Nick Arnstein and Fanny Brice
"Henry Street" – Company
"People" – Fanny Brice
"You Are Woman" – Nick Arnstein and Fanny Brice
"Don't Rain on My Parade" – Fanny Brice

Act II
"Entr'acte" – Orchestra
"Don't Rain on My Parade (Reprise)" – Fanny Brice
"Sadie, Sadie" – Fanny Brice and Company
"Who Taught Her Everything?" – Mrs. Brice and Eddie Ryan
"You Are Woman, I Am Man (Reprise) / Henry Street (Reprise)" – Nick Arnstein and Follies Girls
"Temporary Arrangement" – Nick Arnstein and Men
"Rat-Tat-Tat-Tat" – Fanny Brice and Ensemble
"Who Are You Now? (Reprise) / People (Reprise)" – Fanny Brice and Nick Arnstein
"You're a Funny Girl / Beekman Call" – Nick Arnstein
"What Do Happy People Do?" – Follies Girls
"The Music That Makes Me Dance" – Fanny Brice
"Dream Ballet" – Orchestra
"Funny Girl / Don't Rain On My Parade (Reprise II)" – Fanny Brice
"Bows / People (Reprise II)" – Company

Awards and nominations

Original Broadway production

West End revival (2016)

Broadway revival (2022)

Film adaptation

The namesake 1968 screen adaptation directed by William Wyler paired Streisand with Omar Sharif in the role of Arnstein. Medford repeated her stage role, and Walter Pidgeon was cast as Flo Ziegfeld. The film earned Streisand the Academy Award for Best Actress as well as the Golden Globe. The film was nominated for various awards, including the Academy Award for Best Picture, and became the top-grossing film of 1968.

References

External links
 

1964 musicals
Broadway musicals
West End musicals
Musicals inspired by real-life events
Musicals by Jule Styne
Plays set in New York City